Edward Countryman is an American historian.

Life
He graduated from Manhattan College, and from Cornell University with an MA, and a Ph.D. in 1971.

He taught at Yale University, University of Canterbury, University of Warwick, University of Cambridge.   
He is currently a Distinguished University Professor at Southern Methodist University.

Awards
 1983-91 Royal Historical Society
 L.H.D. Honoris Causa Manhattan College
 1982 Bancroft Prize for A People in Revolution
 1966-71 Danforth Graduate Fellow
 1966-67 Woodrow Wilson Fellow

Works
 Reprinted as a paperback in 1989; see 
   Revised edition Macmillan, 2003 .
  Revised edition Macmillan, 1997, .
  Co-author with Evonne von Heussen-Countryman.
 The Empire State, co-author, Cornell University Press, 2001

Historians at Work, series editor

External links
 https://web.archive.org/web/20100331065626/http://smu.edu/history/faculty/countryman.shtml

References

Manhattan College alumni
Cornell University alumni
Yale University faculty
Academic staff of the University of Canterbury
Southern Methodist University faculty
Academics of the University of Warwick
Academics of the University of Cambridge
Living people
21st-century American historians
American male non-fiction writers
1944 births
Bancroft Prize winners
21st-century American male writers